Betrayal of the Dove is a 1993 American suspense film starring Helen Slater, Billy Zane, and Heather Lind in a screenplay co-written by actor-turned-author Robby Benson.

Plot
Single mother Ellie West (Helen Slater), who is struggling to cut-free a deadbeat ex-husband (Alan Thicke), finds love with surgeon Dr. Jesse Peter (Billy Zane), who she meets at the consult for upcoming out-patient surgery.  Encouraged by her close friend Una (Kelly LeBrock) and supportive boss Sid (Harvey Korman), she proceeds quickly but then has an unusual reaction when she is put under in the operating room, much to the dismay of the lead anesthesiologist (Stuart Pankin).  Post-surgery, Ellie begins to see strange signs indicating that she and her daughter Autumn (Heather Lind) may be in danger but she does not know why or of whom to be wary.  Furthermore, Norman, a timid admirer (David L. Lander) may be the key to piecing together the bizarre alarms of danger going off all around Ellie.

Cast
 Helen Slater as Ellie West
 Billy Zane as Jesse Peter
 Alan Thicke as Jack West
 Kelly LeBrock as Una
 David L. Lander as Norman
 Heather Lind as Autumn West
 Harvey Korman as Sid
 Nedra Volz as Opal Vaneck
 Stuart Pankin as Dr. Gabe
 Bobbie Brown as Erotic Dancer

References

External links
 

1993 films
American drama films
1993 crime thriller films
1990s psychological thriller films
Films shot in California
Films set in California
Medical-themed films
American erotic thriller films
1990s erotic thriller films
1990s English-language films
Films directed by Strathford Hamilton
1990s American films